is a former Japanese pop singer and songwriter under the Giza Studio label.

Biography
Before debuting on August 2000, Chika appeared as a guest of the live session Undown Presents in Kyoto Jittoku.

On September 2000, she debuted with the single Koubutsu written and produced by Chika herself. It was released as both a CD and a cassette tape. The single reached #70 on the Oricon weekly chart, with over 2,500 copies sold. Some fans called her Giza version of Shiina Ringo due to similar melody and voice styles.

Her fourth single Aishini kite Hoshii/Gamusharana Ai was written by a former member of the Japanese band Pamelah (band), Masazumi Ozawa and Makoto Miyoshi from Rumania Montevideo.

Between April and June 2001, she was the main DJ on the radio program Liberal Flower which was broadcast at FM Kyoto.

In May 2001, she released her first and only studio album Yoshida Chika: 12 no Hana.

In December, her fifth single was included in Giza Studio's compilation album Giza Studio Masterpiece Blend 2001, the single was written by Hirohito Furui from Garnet Crow and Masataka Kitaura.

In March 2002, she released her final single Hanareba Nare ni.

In August 2002, through the official website, she announced a hiatus from all her music activities.

Musical style

Influence
On her online website diary she took inspiration during music production from the following artists: Fiona Apple, Thee Headcoats and Yura Yura Teikoku.

Discography
During her career, she released six singles and one studio album.

Singles

Album

Authority
Musicbrainz

References

External links
Official website: 
Official Musing page 

1979 births
Living people
Being Inc. artists
Japanese lyricists
20th-century Japanese women singers
20th-century Japanese singers